Mattia Biso (born 6 May 1977) is an Italian football midfielder.

External links

1977 births
Footballers from Milan
Living people
Italian footballers
Association football midfielders
A.S.D. HSL Derthona players
U.C. Sampdoria players
Carrarese Calcio players
Calcio Lecco 1912 players
S.S. Fidelis Andria 1928 players
A.S.D. Victor San Marino players
S.S. Teramo Calcio players
Ascoli Calcio 1898 F.C. players
Catania S.S.D. players
Spezia Calcio players
Frosinone Calcio players
A.C. Monza players
A.C. Ancona players
A.S.D. Sangiovannese 1927 players
Serie A players
Serie B players
Serie C players
Serie D players